Ghadi is a 2013 Lebanese drama film directed by Amin Dora. The film was originally selected as the Lebanese entry for the Best Foreign Language Film at the 86th Academy Awards in a two-way race over Lara Saba's Blind Intersections. When the film's release date was moved from 26 September 2013 to 31 October 2013, it no longer met the eligibility dates and Blind Intersections became the official submission from Lebanon. The film was submitted the following year as Lebanon's official submission, but was not nominated.

Cast
 Georges Khabbaz as Leba Saba
 Lara Matar as Lara, Leba's Wife
 Christine Choueiri as Sophie

See also
 List of submissions to the 87th Academy Awards for Best Foreign Language Film
 List of Lebanese submissions for the Academy Award for Best Foreign Language Film

References

External links
 

2013 films
2013 drama films
2010s Arabic-language films
Lebanese drama films